HaMerotz LaMillion 3 is the third season of HaMerotz LaMillion (lit. The Race to the Million), an Israeli reality television game show based on the American series The Amazing Race. The third installment of the series features 11 teams of two with a pre-existing relationship in a race around the world to win ₪1,000,000.

This season premiered on 11 May 2013 on Channel 2 with the finale on 31 August 2013 and is hosted by Ron Shahar.

Newlyweds Talia Gorodess and Koby Windzberg were the winners of this season.

Production

Development and filming

The racecourse for this season included four continents and seven countries. At the start of the competition, two legs were run in Israel with the possibility of one team being eliminated in each leg. This season also incorporated two new twists with the Salvage Pass and the Double U-Turn. The Salvage Pass, which was previously seen in The Amazing Race Australia 2 and The Amazing Race Philippines 1, was awarded to the team that came in first on the second leg and gave that team the opportunity to save the team that came in last or receive a time advantage at the beginning of the third leg. 

Two U-Turns this season were designated as Double U-Turns, in which the team that received the most votes for a U-Turn were given the opportunity to U-Turn another team. Leg 11 marks the first time in the franchise two Detours and a U-Turn were placed at the same leg; however, the U-Turn only applied for the first Detour.

Casting
In August 2012, Reshet began casting for a third season of HaMerotz LaMillion, with final applications due on 31 December 2012.

The cast for this season included married grandparents from New York and South Africa, friends from the Ezra youth movement, Port of Ashdod dock workers, and cousins of Persian descent. Coral previously dated Tom Kashty from the second season.

After they were eliminated on Leg 6, Shimi Edri proposed to Yasmin Nagorni, who accepted. The two were married on 3 October 2013, in a ceremony attended by Debbie & Dana, Eliran & Itzik, Ma'ayan & Bat-El, Romi & Coral, and Talia & Koby.

Results
The following teams participated in the season, with their relationships at the time of filming. Note that this table is not necessarily reflective of all content broadcast on television due to inclusion or exclusion of some data. Placements are listed in finishing order:

Key
A  team placement means the team was eliminated.
A  indicates that the team won a Fast Forward.
An underlined leg number indicates that there was no mandatory rest period at the Pit Stop and all teams were ordered to continue racing. An underlined team placement indicates that the team came in last, was ordered to continue racing, and didn't receive a penalty or punishment in the next leg.
A  team placement indicates that the team came in last but was not eliminated.
An  placement indicates that the team came in last on an elimination leg but was saved by the team with the Salvage Pass.
An  team's placement indicates that the team came in last on a non-elimination leg and was required to wear their winter clothing for the duration of the next leg, which took place in Brazil.
A  team's placement indicates that the team came in last on a non-elimination leg and would have to wait an extra 30 minutes before departing on the next leg.
An  indicates that there was a Double Battle on this leg, while an  indicates the team that lost the Double Battle and received a 15-minute penalty.
A  indicates the team who received a U-Turn;  indicates that the team voted for the recipient; A  indicates that the team was granted an exclusive U-Turn in a Double U-Turn;  indicates the team who received it.
A  or  indicates the team who received a Yield;  or  indicates that the team voted for the recipient.
Matching colored symbols (and ) indicate teams who worked together during part of the leg as a result of an Intersection.

Notes

 Andrea & Ronnie arrived at the Pit Stop in last place; however, Ronit & Liran used their Salvage Pass to save Andrea & Ronnie from elimination.
 During the overnight rest, Andrea & Ronnie elected to withdraw from the competition after Ronnie suffered a leg injury that sustained during the Roadblock. Instead of completing the leg, Andrea & Ronnie were sent to the Pit Stop after the other teams had checked-in for their elimination.
 The Double U-Turn appeared after the first of two Detours and targeted teams were only required to perform both tasks of that Detour.

Voting history
Teams may vote to choose either U-Turn or Yield. The team with the most votes received the U-Turn or Yield penalty, depending on the respective leg. In Leg 4 and 11 which contain Double U-Turn, all teams voted on the first U-Turn, but the team who was U-Turned was given the opportunity to use the second U-Turn for their own.

Episode Titles
Translated from Hebrew from the official website:

Prizes
Leg 1 – A gift card loaded with prizes.
Leg 2 – The Salvage Pass (כרטיס הצלה), which allows the holders to save the last place team from elimination or allows them to depart early on the next leg, and a luxurious pampering treatment.
Leg 3 – A gift card loaded with prizes.
Leg 4 – A luxurious gift package.
Leg 5 – A gift card loaded with prizes.
Leg 6 – A gift card loaded with prizes.
Leg 7 – A luxurious gift package.
Leg 8 – A luxurious pampering treatment.
Leg 11 – A gift card loaded with prizes.
Leg 12 – A luxurious pampering treatment.
Leg 13:
1st Place – ₪1,000,000
2nd Place – Two scooters 
3rd Place –  Holiday abroad

Race summary

Leg 1 (Israel)

Airdate: 11 May 2013
Haifa, Haifa District, Israel (Port of Haifa) (Starting Line)
Haifa District (Ein Shemer) 
Caesarea (Caesarea Maritima) 

In Eliezer and the Carrot, teams had to convince 20 passers-by to donate their clothes, which teams would tie into a rope that they could use to pull a giant carrot out of the ground and receive their next clue. In Babar Azar, teams had to deliver 12 sacks across a marked field. However, one team member would have to move on their knees behind the other, mimicking a train engine. After completing the deliveries, the conductor would flip a sign and give teams their clue.

Additional task
At the Port of Haifa, teams had to retrieve their next clue from the top of a large shipping container, which included crossing a rope ladder from one container to another and then crossing a large gap. They would be provided with an assortment of items which they could use however they wanted to get to the top. These items included ladders, hooks, a yoga ball, and a key which, unbeknownst to teams, would unlock a door halfway up that contained an extra ladder. Teams could take as many items that they needed, although it may be difficult to transport certain items up with them.

Leg 2 (Israel)

Airdate: 15 May 2013
Central District (Yakum) 
Tel Aviv, Tel Aviv District (Herods Hotel)
Latrun, Green Line (Mini Israel) 

For this season's first Double Battle, one team member from each team would be held in the air by a pulley, facing down. They would have to hold onto their partner in a bear hug and keep them in the air. The first person to drop their partner would lose. The team that lost the final Double Battle had to wait out a 15-minute penalty.

Additional tasks
After completing the Double Battle, teams would find an informational flyer on the hood of their cars. They had to use these to decipher their next destination: the Herods Hotel. However, it would be written in archaic Hebrew, including using the former name for Tel Aviv: Ahuzat Bayit.
At the Herods Hotel, teams were required to pay 100 Qirsh to gain entry and had to figure out that this equaled 1 new shekel. After entering the hotel, teams had to find Chana Rubina and listen to her recite a poem by Natan Alterman in old Hebrew and then listen to a record of one of his songs. They had to use this song to figure out which suite to go to and tell a nearby man at a typewriter. If they guessed the correct suite, they had go there and find an Alterman impersonator, who would direct them to the suite of Tel Aviv's first mayor, Meir Dizengoff. They would then sample some soup and had to travel to the dining room, where they would find hundred bowls of soup. Using only their sense of taste, they had to find the same soup that they sampled in the suite to get their next clue; however, teams would have to completely consume any bowl of soup they sampled.
After completing the soup task, teams were instructed to travel to Israel's miniature airport, which they had to figure out is at Mini Israel. There, teams had to search the models to find a clue with tickets to their first destination, Madrid, Spain, before checking into the Pit Stop.

Leg 3 (Israel → Spain)

Airdates: 18, 22 & 29 May 2013
 Tel Aviv (Ben Gurion Airport) to Madrid, Spain (Madrid–Barajas Airport)
Moralzarzal (Plaza de Toros) 
 Madrid (Amor de Dios and Villa Rosa or Calle de Fuencarral Shops)
Madrid (Calle Ave María ) 
Madrid (Calle del Doctor Esquerdo  – Martinez's Vegetable Shop)
Madrid (Fernán Núñez Palace )
Madrid (Hotel Meliá Galgos) (Overnight Rest)
Brunete (Plaza Mayor) 
Madrid (Puerta del Sol)
Madrid (Torre Picasso) 

In this season's first Roadblock, one team member had to participate in the sport of bullfighting. They had to dress as a matador, let the bull pass through the cape, and then plant a ribbon on him to receive their next clue.

In Flamenco, teams had to learn a series of Flamenco dance moves. They then had to travel (in costume) to Villa Rosa and perform to the satisfaction of a panel of judges to receive their next clue. In Macarena, teams had to dress up in 90's-esque outfits and stand like statues in a store window. Outside the window was a button, and if a passer-by pushed the button, teams had to perform the Macarena. Once 15 pedestrians pushed the button, teams would receive their next clue.

For this leg's Double Battle, one team member from each team had to search through a pile of tomatoes, looking for one with a marker inside. While they were doing this, their teammates would team up with a group of locals to pelt the opposing team with tomatoes, like during the Spanish La Tomatina festival. The team that lost the final Double Battle had to wait out a 15-minute penalty.

Additional tasks
At Martinez's Vegetable Shop, teams had to put on fake mustaches and pile 50 cauliflowers into their cars and keep them there until the end of the leg. However, once the cauliflowers were all in the car, teams could only walk by linking their arms together and remaining back-to-back.
At the Fernán Núñez Palace, teams had to solve a puzzle. An hourglass would be flipped and teams had to search through the mansion for a collection of items, each with its Hebrew name written out. Teams had to figure out that all of these items contain the same letters which, when scrambled, would spell out "Salvador Dalí", which was the password to open a door and receive their next clue. If they could not figure this out before the hourglass emptied, they would instead have to solve a surrealist jigsaw puzzle, which had an unusual configuration for completion (Not an exact rectangle). Teams were still required to walk back-to-back until they entered the challenge area.
After the above challenge, teams would have to stick their heads inside a cage full of 4000 flies and, without using their hands, eat an apple covered in honey. They also had to spread honey on their fake mustaches.
At Puerta del Sol, teams had to dress up as Don Quixote and Sancho Panza and had to perform one of four of chivalric tasks for Spanish locals. They could choose between carrying someone, helping someone carry their bags, acting as a stepstool, or placing a cloth over a puddle. Afterwards, they had to give someone a ride on a hobby horse.
Teams' final clue was an ID for Pablo Picasso (using his full name, but with "Pablo" and "Picasso" blanked out), which teams had to use to figure out the location of the Pit Stop: Torre Picasso.

Additional note
Teams were given the option to hire a driver for the first half of the leg, but they had to provide all directions.

Leg 4 (Spain)

Airdates: 1, 5 & 8 June 2013
Madrid (Calle de Diego de León) (Pit Start)
 Madrid (Madrid Atocha Railway Station) to Córdoba (Córdoba Railway Station)
Córdoba (Hammam Al Andalus)
Córdoba (Museum of the Inquisition) 
Córdoba (Statue of Maimonides)
 Córdoba (Cordoba Railway Station) to Seville (Seville-Santa Justa Railway Station)
Seville (Calle Sierpes )
Seville (Seville Cathedral)
 Seville (Plaza de España or Calle Sierpes)
Seville (Torre del Oro) 
Seville (Taberna Sol y Sombra)
Seville (Estadio de La Cartuja)
Seville (Metropol Parasol) 

In this leg's Roadblock, one team member had to stick their hand into one of three pots, each filled with something disgusting; maggots, mice or rotten meat. They had to retrieve a numbered card, which would determine how long their partner would have to hold two heavy buckets up above their shoulders to receive their next clue.

In King of Rugs, teams had to travel to Plaza de España, where one team member had to ride on their partner's shoulders and clean a rug by beating it to receive their next clue. In King of Serenades, teams had to join a group of troubadours and sing a serenade in Hebrew to a local female. They had to hand over a violet to the local every time the word "violet" was sung. Halfway through the song, team members had to switch who was singing and who was handing over the flowers. Once teams completed the serenade, they would receive their next clue.

Additional tasks
At Hammam Al Andalus, teams had to wash each other with four bars of soap until a marker saying "Inquisition" was revealed inside one of them to receive their next clue. At random intervals, teams would be splashed with icy water.
After their task at Hammam Al Andalus, teams had to carry two heavy logs across town to the Museum of the Inquisition.
After the Roadblock, teams received a 1 New Shekel note, which has a picture of Maimonides on it, and had to find his statue in Córdoba.
At the statue of Maimonides, teams had to sing and dance with a rabbi, circling the statue four times, and then make a wish. After this, they would receive a departure time to Seville the next morning.
At Calle Sierpes, teams had to dress in sleeping hats and had to convince some locals to carry a bed to the Seville Cathedral while they slept on it. The U-Turn voting board was located here.
At Seville Cathedral, teams had to mimic several funny faces made by winners of past "Funny Face Competitions" to receive their next clue.
At Estadio de La Cartuja, one team member had to score a goal in soccer against two defenders to receive their next clue. Their partner would take on the role of a sports broadcaster and had to give a long cry of "Goooaaalll" at a minimum decibel level. If the broadcaster ran out of breath and stopped shouting, the dribbler had return to the beginning and try to score again.
After the soccer challenge, teams had to search among the stadium's 60,000 seats to find their next clue. However, some envelopes simply contained a card saying "Try again".

Leg 5 (Spain → France)

Airdates: 12, 15 & 19 June 2013
Seville (Walls of Seville) (Pit Start)
 Seville (Seville Airport) to Paris, France (Orly Airport)
Paris (Passerelle Debilly)
Paris (Théâtre Le Ranelagh)
 Paris (Place Marcel-Aymé  or Place des Abbesses)
Paris (Montmartre)
Paris (Place du Tertre)
 Paris (Passage Jouffroy – Le Salon des Miroirs)
Paris (Pont des Arts) 
Paris (Pavillon Kléber) 
Paris (Arc de Triomphe) 

In Marie Antoinette, teams had to eat a selection of raw ingredients used in baking a cake, flour, an egg, oil, sugar, baking soda, cocoa powder, and edible candles, while wearing a corset to receive their next clue. In Cotton Candy, teams would receive a large serving of cotton candy and had to finish it before the one rotation of a carousel to receive their next clue. Each team member was only allowed to use one hand to hold onto the cotton candy, and if they could not finish it before the ride stopped, then they would have to start again.

For this leg's Double Battle, two teams would compete against each other on a French fashion catwalk in underwear, either their own or some provided fashionable underwear. They would be judged by a panel of professionals on their poise and style, their timing and their charisma. The judges would choose one team as a winner and give them the next clue. The team that lost the final Double Battle had to wait out a 15-minute penalty.

In this leg's Roadblock, one team member had to dress up as Quasimodo, the Hunchback of Notre Dame, including an  "hump" on their back. A woman dressed as Esmeralda would give team members a key, and they had to use the key to unlock the one love lock hidden amongst hundreds of locks (representing Quasimodo and Esmeralda's love) to receive their next clue. For every lock that didn't unlock, their partner had ring a bell to declare their failure in love.

Additional tasks
At the Walls of Seville, teams received their first clue in the form of a tablet computer that played the national anthem of their next destination, and they had to identify that they were traveling to France in order to purchase their plane tickets.
From the moment teams left the airport to the Yield reveal board at Montmartre, teams were only permitted to speak in Hebrew.
At Passerelle Debilly, teams encountered a mime whose performance would involve an imitation of can-can dancers, which teams had to identify to receive a garter with teams' next clue on it. Teams would then vote for the team they wished to Yield.
At Théâtre Le Ranelagh, teams had to learn and perform a can-can dance in costume to the satisfaction of a judge to receive their next clue.
At Montmartre, teams would discover if they had been Yielded and would then have to pamper a small French dog. They had to take this dog with them until after the Double Battle. At predetermined intervals, a "barking dog song" would play, and when teams heard this they would have to brush their dog, feed it, and sing a rhyming song to it. They would have to search among the famous painters of Montmartre to find an artist who has drawn a caricature of them and their dog to receive their next clue.
At Pavilion Kleber, teams had to stack 364 champagne coupes into a 12-level pyramid with only one coupe on the top level, then pour the entire contents of a magnum of champagne onto the top of the pyramid, all without breaking any of the glasses, in order to receive their next clue. Every five minutes, teams would have to drink a coupe of champagne.
To check into the Pit Stop, teams had to identify what the Pit Stop greeter was dressed as, who was hidden from view. They had two minutes to ask 21 yes or no questions to try to identify which well-known French icon he was dressed as: a baguette. If they could not guess correctly, they would serve a 15-minute penalty before they could try again.

Leg 6 (France → Brazil)

Airdates: 22, 26 & 29 June 2013
 Paris (Charles de Gaulle Airport) to Rio de Janeiro, Brazil (Rio de Janeiro/Galeão International Airport)
Rio de Janeiro (Rua Anita Garibaldi)
Rio de Janeiro (Copacabana Beach)
Rio de Janeiro (Pepino Beach) 
Rio de Janeiro (Abricó Beach) 
Rocinha (Peniel's Key Stand)
Rocinha (Porta do Céu)
Rocinha (Soccer Field or Coffee Shop) 
Rocinha (Lookout) 
Rio de Janeiro (Federal University of Rio de Janeiro)
Rio de Janeiro (Arpoador Park) 

For this season's only Fast Forward, one team had to play frescoball with a Brazilian couple. The team would find out when they arrived that the task took place on a nude beach, and so all participants had to play in the nude. Each team member would have to work together with one member of the couple each to keep a ball in the air for 30 hits to win the Fast Forward award.

In this leg's Roadblock, one team member had to take a harrowing glider ride from the top of Pedra Bonita back down to Pepino Beach. Once they landed, they had to swim out into the waves to reunite with their partner, who was sitting on a surfboard.

In Football, teams had to play a game of the one in the middle with a group of local football players. They would stand in the middle, and would have to get the ball away from a group of four. They would pass it to their partner, who had to score a goal against a local goalkeeper to receive their next clue. If teams fail to score a goal, they had to start over. In Coffee, teams had to find a cafe, where the owner would prepare five pots of different kinds of coffee. One team member had to drink a glass of the coffee, while the other had to taste the mixture. They had to work together to figure out which mix went with which kind of coffee to receive their next clue.

Additional tasks
At Copacabana, teams had to join with a professional samba dancer and learn how to dance the samba. They would then have to samba with their dance partner continuously until the end of the Roadblock, except when performing other tasks, and had to dance at least once while riding the city bus.
At Copacabana Beach, teams would vote for the U-Turn. They then had to look for a sand sculpture of sunbathers with an arrow pointing them towards their next clue. Teams then had to perform 30 minutes of Brazilian aerobics designed to tone their buttocks.
At Peniel's Key Stand, teams received a key to the Porta do Céu, which they had to find on their own.
At the Federal University of Rio de Janeiro, teams had to endure a Brazilian body waxing session. After this, they had to learn and perform a series of 12 bodybuilding poses for a panel of judges and receive at least 10 points to receive their next clue.
Teams' final clue was a tablet computer that played two songs ("Copacabana" and "The Girl from Ipanema"). Teams had to figure out that the Pit Stop was located between Copacabana and Ipanema beaches.

Leg 7 (Brazil → Cuba)

Airdates: 6, 10 & 13 July 2013
Rio de Janeiro (Novotel RJ Santos Dumont Hotel) (Pit Start)
 Rio de Janeiro (Rio de Janeiro/Galeão International Airport) to Havana, Cuba (José Martí International Airport)
Havana (H. Upmann Cigar Factory)
Havana (Old Havana – El Floridita Bar to Hotel Ambos Mundos) 
Havana (Old Havana – Santería Priestess Residence)
Havana (Old Havana – Hospital Street & Callejon de Hamel)
Havana (Old Havana – Parque Cespedes)
 Havana (Old Havana – Plaza de la Catedral or O'Reilly Street Barbershop)
Havana (Old Havana Pub) 
Havana (Parque Martires del 71)
Havana (Hotel Nacional de Cuba) 

For this leg's Double Battle, teams had to balance a tray of 12 daiquiris between one hand from each team member, and carry them from the Floridita Bar to the Hotel Ambos Mundos through a street festival. Whoever spilled the least liquid below the red line would win the Double Battle and receive their next clue. If it was a tie, then whoever made it to the hotel first would win. The team that lost the final Double Battle had to wait out a 15-minute penalty.

In Cuban Party, teams had to hand out bandanas to at least 40 locals and lead them dancing down the streets to receive their next clue. In Cuban Barbershop, teams had to convince two local men on the street to undergo a beauty treatment, involving shampooing their hair, massaging their scalp, and shaving their facial hair to receive their next clue.

Additional tasks
Upon arrival in Havana, teams had to find a marked classic car and drive themselves to the H. Upmann Cigar Factory, where one team member had to make three Cuban cigars while wearing a blindfold, while the other team member gave them directions as someone read a history of Cuban cigars in Spanish over a loudspeaker to distract them to receive their next clue.
At the Santería residence, teams received an extremely unusual blessing from the priestess to receive their next clue.
On Hospital Street, teams had to find a fortune teller. She would use Tarot cards to read their fortune, after which they would vote for the U-Turn.
After the Detour, teams had to search for a Cuban hitchhiker at a marked pick-up location and drive them to their house. Once there, they had to take a 30-minute break to eat dinner with and spend time with the local they had picked up. Towards the end of their visit, the Cuban family would deliver them a package that had been sent from the teams' families in Israel.

Leg 8 (Cuba)

Airdates: 17 & 20 July 2013
Havana (Hotel Meliá Habana) (Pit Start)
Ciénaga de Zapata (Crocodile Farm)
Ciénaga de Zapata (Soplillar Village) 
Matanzas (Victoria de Girón – Campismo Popular)
Matanzas (Victoria de Girón – Green Bar)
Matanzas (Playa Shackleton) 
Matanzas (Beach) 
Matanzas (Playa Centro de Fionros)
Ciénaga de Zapata (Boca de Guama) 

For this leg's Double Battle, two teams at the time had to compete in a horse-drawn cart race, following a series of flags into a full race course all the way to the finish line. The team that lost the final Double Battle had to wait out a 15-minute penalty.

In Robbery at Sea, teams had to retrieve all of the items from a boat moored just off shore, carrying them through the waves with only their arms. After all the items had been delivered to shore, they would also have to carry the pirate in the boat to shore on their shoulders. However, they had to carry at least one of the objects along with the pirate. In Robbery in the Air, teams would both be suspended in a net hanging in the air. They had to use ropes to pull themselves towards a hanging flag and satchel of money, which they had to grab. If they dropped one of the items, they had to restart.

Additional tasks
At the crocodile farm, teams would first enter a pen filled with baby Cuban crocodiles and each team member had to use their bare hands to catch eight of them at once. After this, they would enter a different pen and would have to use a stick and rope to wrangle a full grown Cuban crocodile.
At Campismo Popular, after voting for who would be U-Turned, teams had to take a 25-minute break from racing, during which they could eat fruit, drink fruit juice, and write a message to their loved ones at home, which they would put in a bottle and throw out to sea.
At the green bar, teams had to dress up as pirates and wear the outfit for the rest of the leg, including an eyepatch.
At Playa Centro de Fionros, one team member would be buried up to their head in the sand. The other team member would have to pour bottles of sticky, slimy liquids on top of their head, looking for a small pearl. They could then open a treasure chest and retrieve a treasure map, which would direct them to the Pit Stop.

Leg 9 (Cuba → United States)

Airdates: 24, 27 & 31 July 2013, 3 August 2013
Havana (Hotel Meliá Habana) (Pit Start)
 Havana (José Martí International Airport) to Las Vegas, Nevada, United States (McCarran International Airport)
Las Vegas (Fremont Street)
Las Vegas (Harley Davidson Cafe)
Las Vegas (Little White Wedding Chapel and Las Vegas City Hall)
Las Vegas (Las Vegas Boulevard) 
Las Vegas (Tropicana Avenue)
Las Vegas (Star Costume & Theatrical Supply)
Las Vegas (Roxy's Diner) 
Las Vegas (Dino's Lounge)
Las Vegas (Golden Gate Casino Hotel) 
Las Vegas (Golden Nugget Hotel & Casino)
Las Vegas (Stratosphere Tower) 
Las Vegas (Mandalay Bay – Intersection of Giles Street and Ali Baba Lane)  

For this leg's Double Battle, teams had to play a simplified version of strip poker against each other. Each team would be dealt a card, and the team with the lower card would have to take off an article of clothing. Aces were high. This would continue until one team refused to take off anything else (or had nothing left to take off). The losing team would be forced to walk the streets naked while wearing a cardboard box with the humiliating message of "I just lost a game of strip poker". The team that lost the final Double Battle had to wait out a 15-minute penalty.

In this leg's first Roadblock, one team member had to enter a revolving glass door and change out of their Elvis costume and into a superhero outfit within 20 seconds while the door rotated. Then, they had to carry both their partner and a cut-out design of a car, keeping both off the ground and the car above their head, and search the Las Vegas Strip for a woman dressed as a princess outside of the Golden Nugget Hotel & Casino to get their next clue.

In this leg's second Roadblock, the team member who did not perform the previous Roadblock had to perform a  SkyJump off the Stratosphere Tower before receiving their next clue.

Additional tasks
On Fremont Street, teams would come across a roulette with the numbers 1 to 6. Teams had to spin a roulette wheel on this street with the numbers 1-6. Teams had to spin the wheel and remove whichever number it landed on. This number would indicate the position that they were allowed to leave in. For example, if teams span a "2" but no-one had spun a "1" yet, they would have to wait until someone span a "1" and departed in first place before they could depart in second.
At the Harley Davidson Cafe, teams had to win an arm wrestling match against a 120+ kg patron. They would then both have to drink a large glass of non-alcoholic beer, entirely consuming it in 2 minutes, to get their next clue.
Teams traveled from the Cafe to the wedding chapel on Harley Davidson motorcycles.
At the Little White Wedding Chapel, teams had to search the streets for a couple willing to get married. They would then travel, along with the couple, to City Hall to get a legal marriage license for the couple. Finally, they would return to the Wedding Chapel perform the wedding, with the team members acting as best men and maids of honour. If the wedding went off without any problems, teams would get their next clue.
At Las Vegas Boulevard, teams had to find a limo to pick up their next clue inside.
At Tropicana Avenue, teams voted for who would get Yielded.
At Star Costume, teams would be given a single 7XL shirt and a pair of 7XL pants. Both team members would have to wear these together and then travel to Roxy's Diner. They had to remain in these clothes until they reached Dino's Lounge.
During the Intersection at Roxy's Diner, the joined teams had to work together to eat a single  hamburger to receive their next clue. Teams were no longer Intersected after this task.
At Dino's Lounge, teams would discover if they had been Yielded. Then, teams had to dress up as Elvis Presley, watch a video of Presley's performances, and perform the song to the satisfaction of an Elvis impersonator to receive their next clue.
At the intersection of Giles and Ali Baba, teams stepped an empty Pit Stop mat where a limo would arrive to pick them up. After being welcomed by "Marilyn Monroe" they would find the host, Ron Shahar, in the limo where he would check them in for the leg while being driven around. However, the teams were told to keep on racing and were dropped off back at the intersection.

Leg 10 (United States)

Airdates: 7 & 10 August 2013
West Las Vegas (Dig This! Heavy Equipment Playground) 
West Las Vegas (Halloween-Themed House)
Las Vegas (Howard Johnson Hotel) (Overnight Rest)
Las Vegas (Longevity Sports Center)
Boulder City (Chevron Aviation Building)
Boulder City (A&W Parking Lot)
Clark County (Hoover Dam) 

In this season's final Roadblock, one team member had to be buried alive in a wooden crate, simulating the actions of the American Mafia, and had to remain buried for 10 minutes without panicking to receive their next clue.

Additional tasks
At the cemetery set up at Dig This!, teams would watch a creepy video of a man reading a text, which incorporated the Hebrew names of various American horror films. They had to figure out that the theme of the video was horror movies and tell this to the gate guard to receive their next clue and be granted entry.
At the house, teams had to perform three tasks, choosing from two "Trick" tasks and two "Treat" ones, to receive their next clue. The trick tasks were to kiss a frog, in reference to The Frog Prince, and to successfully bob for five apples each from icy water. The treat tasks were to eat a very large gummy bear, and to take a pie in the face by surprise. They could pick "trick" or "treat" to decide which task they would complete next, but the tasks would be completely unknown to them.
After the Trick or Treat task, teams went around to the back of the house to find a dunk tank. One team member had to sit in the tank while the other had to hit a target, plunging their partner into the cold, slimy water. The dunked team member had to then find a small flag inside the tank.
At the Longevity Sports Center, teams had to play American football against four members of the Legends Football League and score a touchdown to receive their next clue.
Teams would be driven from Las Vegas to Boulder City in the cabin of an 18-wheeler. Unbeknownst to them, after the song "Take Me Home, Country Roads" finished playing on the radio, teams would listen to a special radio broadcast and a song dedication "for a couple who left everything behind to travel around the world, to take part in The Amazing Race". A message from their families would start to play and after this, the chosen song.
At the Chevron Aviation building, team members had to work together to pull a 12-ton 18-wheeler across a marked red line to receive their next clue.
At the A&W parking lot, teams had to help out at a bikini car wash. They had to charge $3 per car wash, but were allowed to ask for tips. Teams had to make enough money to pay their truck driver for gas to get them to the Pit Stop.

Additional note
During the Pit Stop, teams received video messages from their loved ones at home. After this, teams participated in a task for fun that involved matching all eleven teams with their baby pictures.

Leg 11 (United States)

Airdates: 17, 21 & 28 August 2013
 Clark County (Hoover Dam) to Flagstaff, Arizona (DoubleTree Flagstaff) (Pit Start)
Flagstaff (Arizona Snowbowl)
Flagstaff (Flagstaff Nordic Center)   
Camp Verde (Wigwam Valley Ranch) (Overnight Rest)
Black Canyon City (Canyon Creek Ranch)  

For this season's final Double Battle, teams would compete in a two-person dog sledding relay race. Each team member could only race while in possession of the snow globe. The team that finished first would receive their next clue, while the losing team had to wait for another opponent. The team that lost the final Double Battle had to wait out a 15-minute penalty.

In Collect, teams had to stack firewood until they made a perfectly rectangular stack that was at least 2 meters high. In Haul, both team members had to put on snowshoes and carry two people on their backs around a marked course through the woods. A maximum of three teams would be able to complete each side of the Detour simultaneously.

In Rodeo, both team members had to ride on a mechanical bull and stay on for 30 sequences of the ride to receive their next clue. In Country, teams had to learn how to perform a country yodel. If teams could perform yodeling accompaniment to an acoustic song to the satisfaction of an audience, they would receive their next clue.

Additional tasks
At the Arizona Snowbowl, teams would receive a rescue toboggan and an avalanche beacon. They would have to climb up a snowy hill and use the avalanche beacon to find a buried search & rescue training mannequin. They had to dig out the mannequin, secure it onto the toboggan, and then slide back down the hill to receive a snow globe with their next destination printed on the inside. After this, they would vote for who would be U-Turned.
At Wigwam Valley Ranch, teams had to learn how to perform a Native American traditional dance involving hoops. They would then meet the tribal chief of the village and would be given Native American garments and feathers. They would also be given a traditional Native American name, which they had to use to refer to each other for the remainder of the leg.
Teams then had to perform two Native American hunting exercises. One team member would have to use a bow to shoot an arrow at a rolling target, and the other would have to throw a spear at a target thrown in the air. If teams run out of arrows or spears, they had to perform a traditional dance before their supply would be replenished.
After completing the previous task, teams had to remove most of their clothing and had to enter a sweat lodge with temperatures near  and talk with the chief about the meaning of life. They then had to rub dirt on their skin to blend with mother earth. Then, they had to submerge themselves in icy water ten times, which would give them "the answers to unanswered questions". Finally, they would return, once again to the sweat lodge to warm up.
For their final task at the Wigwam Valley Ranch, teams had to build a fire, and then completely build a teepee, using a completed one for reference. Teams would spend the night in these teepees.
At Canyon Creek Ranch, teams had to dress up as cowboys/cowgirls and ride on horses through the desert to reach the ranch's corral. There, they would have to work together (on foot) to herd three young cows with the same matching bandana into a small enclosure.
After the second Detour, teams would be asked a series of three questions about the other competitors. They would use a real gun to shoot at targets representing their answers. If they answer incorrectly, they would be handcuffed and placed into jail, where they would serve a time penalty.
For their final task at the Canyon Creek Ranch, teams had to search the old west town for a horseshoe, which they could take with them to the Pit Stop just behind the church.

Additional note
During the Pit Stop, teams were transported by bus to Flagstaff, Arizona.

Leg 12 (United States → Taiwan)

Airdate: 29 August 2013
 Phoenix (Phoenix Sky Harbor International Airport) to Taipei, Taiwan (Taiwan Taoyuan International Airport) via Israel
Taipei (Chiang Kai-shek Memorial Hall) (Pit Start)
Taipei (Central Pictures Studio)
Taipei (Sun Yat-sen Square)
Taipei (Taipei Confucius Temple)
Taipei (Raohe Street Night Market)
Taipei (Ximending) 

Additional tasks
At Central Pictures Studio, teams had to sit on a swing set and sing the song "Muzika" (Music) by Svika Pick, while the swing set is descending into a tank full of water that snakes are poured into while the team members singing the song. They had to smile throughout their performance and sing all of the lyrics correctly.
At Sun Yat-sen Square, teams had to sell 12 glasses of fruit juice. One of the team members made the juice while the other drove the cart. After this task, they would receive a board with their next destination written in fruit pixel art in Chinese and had to deliver this board to the Confucius Temple.
At Taipei Confucius Temple, one team member would practice tai chi by balancing a book on their head while on one foot. The other member would listen to a Chinese proverb over a pay phone, memorizing it without the use of notes. After hearing the phone call, the team member went to the other member, and quoted the sentence to them. Then, the team member who practiced tai chi went to a wise old man, and said the sentence his partner quoted. Only after saying the sentence correctly, the man gave them the next clue. Eventually, after enough failures, one team member must, instead of practicing tai chi, hold a plate of stinky tofu right up to their nose.
At Raohe Street Night Market, teams had to search for the next clue, which was a leaflet being handed out to them by a Taiwanese person in Hebrew which lead teams to Ximending.

Leg 13 (Taiwan)

Airdate: 31 August 2013
Pingsi (Jingan Suspension Bridge)
Pingsi (Shifen Waterfall)
Taipei (Huashan 1914 Creative Park)
Taipei (Taipei Railway Station)
 Wulai District (Yun Hsien Resort)
Taipei (Snake Alley Night Market)
Taipei (Grand Hotel) 

Additional tasks
At Jingan Suspension Bridge, teams would choose a sky lantern from a selection of colors, each representing a different virtue, and release it into the sky to receive their next clue.
At Shifen Waterfall, teams had to use a complex system to transport themselves across a tightrope. Both team members would lay on planks of wood, suspended on the tightropes, facing each other. They would hold on to a third piece of wood between them, and work together to push themselves across, grab a flag, then return to the start. If they fell off, they would have to begin again from the start.
At Creative Park, teams had to convince two locals to trade their parasols for a bottle of sunscreen to receive their next clue.
At Taipei Railway Station, teams had to convince 10 locals to dance with them to "Gangnam Style" by following the moves of a dancing robot while the song played to receive their next clue.
At the Yun Hsien Resort, teams participated in tasks inspired by Skyfall. They would ride a cable car halfway to the top of a mountain, where one team member had to climb up on top of it and retrieve a clue. They would then discover that the other team member would have to descend a perilous rope ladder below the cable car to retrieve a small satchel with a Taiwanese coin inside of it. After this, they would ride the cable car to the top of the mountain, where they could use the coin to operate a coin-game, which would give them their next clue.
The clue from the coin-operated machine contained a Chinese proverb in Hebrew that encouraged generosity. Once at the night market, teams had to use this hint to figure out that they had to give some spare change to a busker playing a ukulele. In exchange, he would give them their final clue.

Ratings
The third season had a 28.9% average Jewish household rating across the season.

Data courtesy of the Israeli Rating Committee, according to individuals aged 4+ from the general population.

References

External links
Official website 

HaMerotz LaMillion seasons
2013 Israeli television seasons
Television shows filmed in Israel
Television shows filmed in Spain
Television shows filmed in France
Television shows filmed in Brazil
Television shows filmed in Cuba
Television shows filmed in Nevada
Television shows filmed in Arizona
Television shows filmed in Taiwan